Gauntlett is a surname. Notable people with the surname include:

 David Gauntlett (born 1971), sociologist and media theorist
 George Edward Luckman Gauntlett (1868–1956), educator
 Henry Gauntlett (1805–1876), English hymn writer
 Richard Gauntlett (born 1963), actor/entertainer/comedian
 Rob Gauntlett (1987–2009), explorer
Tsuneko Gauntlett (1873-1953), Japanese feminist, pacifist
 Victor Gauntlett (1942–2003), entrepreneur